The Ford Reflex (or REFL3X, as spelled on the vehicle nameplate) is a concept car introduced at the 2006 North American International Auto Show that, according to Ford, "proves small cars can be bold and American". It is a technological showcase that includes solar panel-powered headlights, integrated child seat, baby cam with a monitor mounted on the dash, inflatable rear safety belts, and an interior quieted by ground rubber taken from Nike athletic shoe outsoles. A production version of the Reflex design has not yet been announced.

The concept features an electric motor on the rear axle in addition to its hybrid propulsion system on the front axle. The rear motor provides all wheel drive capability, improved driving dynamics, and the fuel economy benefits of a full hybrid vehicle.  Reflex's energy is stored in a new-generation lithium-ion battery pack, using the same technology found in cell phones. Ford was the first manufacturer to produce an electric vehicle using this type of battery system when it introduced the electric Ford Ka research vehicle in 2000. Also contributing to Reflex's power and performance are unique headlamps and taillamps that integrate solar panels. The Ford-patented battery-charging lighting system improves fuel economy by using the sun's power to charge the on-board batteries, while capturing and reusing the daylight at night.

The Reflex features 2+1 seating, with a center-mounted rear "love seat" for 2 children or one adult, that also includes a fold-out rear-facing child seat.  "Ford Reflex is a small car that doesn't feel small," says Freeman Thomas, director, Ford North American Strategic Design. "It is a gorgeous sporty car that delivers guilt free performance with a hybrid engine. And thanks to its innovative approach to the interior, it has space for growing families."

Reflex is set off with Ford's three-bar grille – made of high-strength anodized extruded aluminum, which is hand polished to a matte finish. The concept's shoulder line flows upward to the B-pillar and back down into the wheel arch. Reverse butterfly doors aid vehicle ingress and egress.

The Reflex concept car is similar in size and general configuration as the Mazda Kabura concept, and if they are both ordered into production could share a common platform, with styling and powertrain differences to set the pair apart.  For example, while the Kabura concept included a 2.0L 16 valve DOHC piston inline-four engine, a production Kabura might end up with a rotary engine, as used in the Mazda RX-8.  The Reflex would likely have a more conventional gasoline or diesel (or hybrid) engine.

References

External links
Ford Reflex Press Kit Materials
Sound Bites from Ford Reflex Press Release Material
Ford Reflex Concept Pictures

All-wheel-drive vehicles
Reflex